Maecenas Eason Benton (January 29, 1848 – April 27, 1924) was a U.S. Representative from Missouri.  He was the father of Thomas Hart Benton, who gained fame as a painter of the American Scene.

Biography

Born near Dyersburg, Tennessee, Benton attended two west Tennessee academies and Saint Louis University. He was graduated from the Cumberland School of Law at Cumberland University, Lebanon, Tennessee, in 1870. He served in the Confederate States Army during the Civil War. He was admitted to the bar and commenced practice in Neosho, Missouri. He served as prosecuting attorney of Newton County, Missouri, from 1878 to 1884 and subsequently the United States attorney from March 1885 to July 1889. He also served as delegate to the 1896 Democratic National Convention. On June 24, 1888 he married Elizabeth Wise of Waxahachie, Texas.

Congressional career

Benton was elected as a Democrat to the 55th, 56th, 57th, and 58th congresses (March 4, 1897 – March 3, 1905). An unsuccessful candidate for re-election in 1904 to the 59th Congress, he resumed his law practice in Neosho, Missouri, and served as member of the State constitutional conventions in 1922 and 1924. He died in Springfield, Missouri, April 27, 1924 of throat cancer and was interred in the Odd Fellows Cemetery, Neosho, Missouri.  He is pictured in the 1939 Neosho centennial mural, in Neosho, Missouri, by James Duard Marshall.

References

1848 births
1924 deaths
People from Dyersburg, Tennessee
People of Tennessee in the American Civil War
Confederate States Army personnel
Democratic Party members of the United States House of Representatives from Missouri
United States Attorneys for the Western District of Missouri
19th-century American politicians
20th-century American politicians
Deaths from throat cancer
Deaths from cancer in Missouri